Beccuto Madonna is a c.1420-1425 fresco fragment by Paolo Uccello, now in the Museo nazionale di San Marco in Florence, Italy.

It was originally sited in one of the Del Beccuto family's houses between Via dei Vecchietti and Via Teatina, not far from the Church of Santa Maria Maggiore. It was rediscovered during the building's demolition in 1894 to create the Piazza della Repubblica.

References

Paintings by Paolo Uccello
1420s paintings
Fresco paintings in the collection of the Museo Nazionale di San Marco
Paintings of the Madonna and Child